HMAS Ipswich (J186/B244/A118), named for the city of Ipswich, Queensland, was one of 60 s built during World War II and one of 20 built on Admiralty order but manned by personnel of and later commissioned into the Royal Australian Navy (RAN).

Ipswich was later operated by the Royal Netherlands Navy (RNLN) as HNLMS Morotai, and by the Indonesian Navy (TNI-AL) as KRI Hang Tuah. In Indonesian service in 1958 the ship was attacked by a CIA aircraft and sunk with considerable loss of life.

Design and construction

In 1938, the Australian Commonwealth Naval Board (ACNB) identified the need for a general purpose 'local defence vessel' capable of both anti-submarine and mine-warfare duties, while easy to construct and operate. Construction of the prototype  did not go ahead, but the plans were retained. The need for locally built 'all-rounder' vessels at the start of World War II saw the "Australian Minesweepers" (designated as such to hide their anti-submarine capability, but popularly referred to as "corvettes") approved in September 1939, with 60 constructed during the course of the war: 36 ordered by the RAN, 20 (including Ipswich) ordered by the British Admiralty but manned and commissioned as RAN vessels, and 4 for the Royal Indian Navy.

Ipswich was laid down by Evans Deakin & Co at Brisbane in Queensland on 6 March 1941. She was launched on 11 August 1941 by Evelyn Foll, wife of the Minister for the Interior Harry Foll, and commissioned on 13 June 1942.

Operational history

RAN
Ipswich was employed from commissioning until 3 November 1942 as a convoy escort in Australian waters. From 3 November 1942 until 21 January 1945, Ipswich was assigned to the British Eastern Fleet, primarily serving in the Indian Ocean and Persian Gulf, but spending May to October 1943 in the Mediterranean.

Upon leaving the British Eastern Fleet, Ipswich returned to Australia, where she was assigned to the British Pacific Fleet. Ipswich was present in Tokyo Bay on Victory over Japan Day (2 September 1945), when the Japanese Instrument of Surrender was signed.

Ipswich earned five battle honours for her wartime service: "Pacific 1942", "Indian Ocean 1942–45", "Sicily 1943", "East Indies 1944", and "Okinawa 1945".

RNLN
Ipswich paid off from RAN service on 5 July 1946 and was transferred to the Royal Netherlands Navy and renamed HNLMS Morotai.

TNI-AL
Morotai was transferred to the Indonesian Navy in 1949 and renamed KRI Hang Tuah. On 28 April 1958 a Douglas B-26 Invader aircraft, painted black and showing no markings, bombed and sank her off Balikpapan in southern Borneo. 18 crew were killed and another 28 were wounded.

The B-26's co-pilot was Colonel Muharto of the Permesta rebel movement's AUREV insurgent air force but the aircraft, its ammunition and pilot were supplied by the CIA as part of an insurgency to destabilise President Sukarno's government. The pilot was William H. Beale, a former United States Army Air Forces lieutenant colonel then employed by a Taiwan-based CIA front organisation, Civil Air Transport.

Citations

References

Books

Journal and news articles

Bathurst-class corvettes of the Royal Australian Navy
Ships built in Queensland
1941 ships
World War II corvettes of Australia
Bathurst-class corvettes of the Indonesian Navy
Corvettes sunk by aircraft
Maritime incidents in 1958
Maritime incidents in Indonesia
Ships sunk by US aircraft